The Reynolds School District is a rural, public school district serving parts of Mercer County, Pennsylvania. Reynolds School District encompasses approximately  encompassing the communities of Fredonia, West Salem Township, Delaware Township, and Pymatuning Township. The western border of the district is part of the Pennsylvania - Ohio border. According to 2000 federal census data, it served a resident population of 10,158. By 2010, the district's population declined to 9,611 people. It is built on what was once a military camp during World War II, Camp Reynolds. In 2009, the district residents' per capita income was $16,380 while the median family income was $42,200. In the Commonwealth, the median family income was $49,501 and the United States median family income was $49,445, in 2010.

Reynolds School District operates two schools: Reynolds Elementary School and Reynolds Junior/Senior High School.

Extracurriculars
Reynolds School District offers a variety of clubs, activities and an extensive sports program.

Sports
The District funds:

Boys
Baseball - AA
Basketball- AA
Cross Country - A
Football Varsity and JV teams - A
Golf - AA
Track and Field - AA
Wrestling	- AA

Girls
Basketball - A
Cross Country - A
Golf - AA
Softball - A
Track and Field - AA
Volleyball - A

Junior High School Sports

Boys
Basketball
Cross Country
Football
Track and Field
Wrestling	

Girls
Basketball
Cross Country
Track and Field
Volleyball

According to PIAA directory July 2013 

In the year 2020, the Reynolds Jr/Sr High School Football team made it to the State Championships. Their best record in 2020 was 10-0-0.

References

School districts in Mercer County, Pennsylvania